The Sport Hornet LRS is a Light Sport Aircraft.  One unique attribute that sets the Sport Hornet LRS apart from other LSA Aircraft is the air spring suspension system on the landing gear. This protects the aircraft from damage in the event of "miscalculated" landings and allows for a better experience for the pilot and passengers.

The company and website

Specifications

References

External links
 Sport Hornet Website

1990s United States sport aircraft
Light-sport aircraft